Los Alamos chess (or anti-clerical chess) is a chess variant played on a 6×6 board without bishops. This was the first chess-like game played by a computer program. This program was written at Los Alamos Scientific Laboratory by Paul Stein and Mark Wells for the  computer in 1956. The reduction of the board size and the number of pieces from standard chess was due to the very limited capacity of computers at the time.

Game rules 
The starting position is illustrated. All rules are as in chess except:
 There is no pawn double-step move, nor is there the en passant capture;
 Pawns may not be promoted to bishops;
 There is no castling.

Los Alamos trials 

The computer played three games. The first it played against itself. The second one was against a strong human player, who played without a queen. The human player won. In the third game, MANIAC I played against a laboratory assistant who had been taught the rules of chess in the preceding week specifically for the game. The computer won, marking the first time that a computer had beaten a human player in a chess-like game.

The third game 

White: MANIAC I  Black: Beginner 1.d3 b4 2.Nf3 d4 3.b3 e4 4.Ne1 a4 5.bxa4 Nxa4 6.Kd2 Nc3 7.Nxc3 bxc3+ 8.Kd1 f4 9.a3 Rb6 10.a4 Ra6 11.a5 Kd5 12.Qa3 Qb5 13.Qa2+ Ke5 14.Rb1 Rxa5 15.Rxb5 Rxa2 16.Rb1 Ra5 17.f3 Ra4 18.fxe4 c4 19.Nf3+ Kd6 20.e5+ Kd5 21.exf6=Q Nc5 22.Qxd4+ Kc6 23.Ne5

See also 
 Minichess

References 

Bibliography

 Issue #14

Further reading 
 Chess Review, January 1957

External links 
 Los Alamos Chess by Hans L. Bodlaender, The Chess Variant Pages
 A short history of computer chess by Frederic Friedel
 BrainKing.com - internet server to play Los Alamos chess.

Chess variants
Computer chess
1956 in chess
Board games introduced in 1956